WR 124 is a Wolf–Rayet star in the constellation of Sagitta surrounded by a ring nebula of expelled material known as M1-67. It was discovered by Paul W. Merrill in 1938, identified as a high-velocity Wolf–Rayet star. It is listed in the General Catalogue of Variable Stars as QR Sagittae with a range of 0.08 magnitudes.

Distance
A 2010 study of WR 124 directly measured the expansion rate of the M1-67 nebula expelled from the star using Hubble Space Telescope camera images taken 11 years apart, and compared that to the expansion velocity measured by the Doppler shift of the nebular emission lines. The luminosity is also lower than predicted by models for a star of this spectral class. Gaia Early Data Release 3 gives a similar parallax, which would suggest a distance .

Physical characteristics

The mass is calculated from evolutionary models to be .

WR 124 is measured to still be about 15% hydrogen with most of the remaining mass being helium. A young highly massive and luminous WN8h star would still be burning hydrogen in its core, but a less luminous and older star would be burning helium in its core. In either case, it has only a few hundred thousand years before it explodes as a type Ib or Ic supernova.

The mass loss rate is – per year, depending on the distance and properties determined for the star.

Nebula

WR 124 is surrounded by an intensely hot nebula formed from the star's extreme stellar wind. If placed in the Solar System, one of these clumps would span the distance from the Sun to Saturn.

External links
http://apod.nasa.gov/apod/ap981109.html
http://hubblesite.org/newscenter/archive/releases/1998/38/image/a

References

Wolf–Rayet stars
Runaway stars
Sagitta (constellation)
Sagittae, QR
Merrill's star
094289